The Chappell Farmhouse is a historic house in New York, United States. It was built in 1835 and was listed on the National Register of Historic Places in 1987. The farmhouse shows late Federal style/early Greek Revival style architecture.

It is part of the Cazenovia Town Multiple Resource Area.

References

Houses on the National Register of Historic Places in New York (state)
Federal architecture in New York (state)
Greek Revival houses in New York (state)
Houses completed in 1835
Houses in Madison County, New York
National Register of Historic Places in Cazenovia, New York